Paul Beckman (born May 27, 1952) is an American politician who served in the Alabama House of Representatives from the 88th district from 2010 to 2018.

References

1952 births
Living people
People from Fort Lewis, Washington
Republican Party members of the Alabama House of Representatives